Mezraku (also Romanized as Mezrākū; also known as Mezrākūh) is a village in Isin Rural District, in the Central District of Bandar Abbas County, Hormozgan Province, Iran. At the 2006 census, its population was 107, in 30 families.

References 

Populated places in Bandar Abbas County